Jabez W. "Jack" White (born 1879) was a footballer who played as a full back for Leeds City in the Football League. He also played for Ollenshaw United, Grays Anchor, Swanscombe, Grays United, Queens Park Rangers and Merthyr Town.

References

1879 births
People from Droylsden
English footballers
Grays Athletic F.C. players
Queens Park Rangers F.C. players
Stockport County F.C. players
Leeds City F.C. players
Merthyr Town F.C. players
English Football League players
Year of death missing
Date of birth missing
Association football fullbacks